Peter Heppner (born 7 September 1967 in Hamburg) is the former lead singer of the German electronica/synth pop band Wolfsheim, and has collaborated with many other electronic music acts, such as Paul van Dyk, Schiller, and Goethes Erben.

Career 
Being singer and songwriter for Wolfsheim since 1987, his first commercial success was in 1991 releasing the single "The Sparrows and the Nightingales". In 1998, he had a big charts success with NDW star Joachim Witt and their duet "Die Flut". In the years following, his notability as a singer increased. Collaborating with Schiller, he achieved international chart hits with "Dream of You" (2001) and "Leben... I Feel You" in 2004. In the same year, he released the song "Wir Sind Wir" with  Paul van Dyk. Although the song was controversial the artists recorded another version together with the Filmorchester Babelsberg which was performed at the official ceremony for the Day of German Unity on 3 October 2005 in Potsdam. A more recent project with  Mila Mar and Kim Sanders formerly of Culture Beat spawned the single "Aus Gold", intended to support Afghan poorhouses in conjunction with Deutsches Rotes Kreuz (German Red Cross). Another collaboration was with previous Wolfsheim producer, José Alvarez-Brill, on the song "Vielleicht", featured on the album Alvarez Presents Zeitmaschine Remixed (2005).

Heppner's first solo effort Solo was released in Germany on 12 September 2008 through Warner Music. The songs on the disc were produced by Peter-John Vettese as well as Alvarez-Brill. The album peaked at #9 on the German charts and was preceded by the single "Alleinesein" on 5 September 2008.

In 2010, he released the song "Haus der 3 Sonnen" with German singer Nena.

Peter Heppner's second solo album, My Heart of Stone, was released on 18 May 2012 through Universal Music (DE). My Heart of Stone entered the German album charts at #6 and was preceded by the online-single and video "God Smoked" in April 2012 and the regular single "Meine Welt" on 4 May 2012.

In 2012, he also performed on two duets with Kim Sanders ("Deserve To Be Alone") and German singer Marianne Rosenberg ("Genau Entgegengesetzt").

As a thank-you gift for his fans he released an English and a German version of the online-single "Dream of Christmas / Traum von Weihnachten" in December 2012.

On 8 February 2014, he was a guest singer on the stage at German synthpop trio Camouflage's 30th anniversary concert that was held in Dresden, Germany. He performed a duet with lead vocal Marcus Meyn on the song "That Smiling Face", the band's 1988 single released from their first studio album "Voices and Images".

Discography 
Studio albums

Concert tours 
 01.2009–04.2009: solo Tour
 01.2010–10.2010: Clubtour
 11.2012–04.2013: My Heart of Stone Tour
 11.2014–09.2015: Peter Heppner Akustik

Awards 
 ECHO Pop
 2002: „Dance/Techno Künstler/in oder Gruppe National“ (Dream of You)

References

External links

 NOT working - 404 Error
 
 
 Peter Heppner at Discogs
 Peter Heppner at Universal Music Group website - NOT working - 404 Error
 Ausführliches Interview mit Peter Heppner auf Alternativmusik.de

1967 births
Living people
German pop singers
German rock singers
German electronic musicians
German male singers